The following is the list of banks in Jordan.

Mobile payment

See also 

 List of banks in the Arab world

References

Banks of Jordan
Jordan
Jordan
Banks